Nik Neves (born in 1976) is a Brazilian illustrator and graphic artist based in Porto Alegre (Brazil) and Berlin (Germany).

Early life and education 

Neves was born in São Paulo (Brazil), but grew up in Porto Alegre. He graduated in Advertising from FAMECOS – PUC RS in 2001, and received a second bachelor's degree in Visual Arts at the Instituto de Artes – UFRGS in 2003. In 2004 he studied Illustration in Barcelona at EINA (Universitat Autónoma de Barcelona). After that, he continued his education studying lettering, typography and comics at School of Visual Arts SVA in New York.

Work 
Neves began working systematically as illustrator after he completed Curso Abril de Jornalismo in 2001. The first years of his career were more focused on editorial illustration, but soon after he started working also for publishing and advertising. Neves’ drawings have been published in Lonely Planet Magazine, National Geographic, Rolling Stone, Vogue Magazine, Le Monde, Descobrir Catalunya, Strapazin, Playboy, Runners magazine. He has had major independent and corporate clients such as Brooklyn Industries, United Nations (FAO), Hearst Corp, Condé Nast, Academy of Motion Picture Arts and Sciences (The Oscars), The Academy Awards (the Oscars), H&M.

Highlighted and featured works are the minimalist book cover of the Brazilian edition of Infinite Jest, by David Foster Wallace,  and the book “Declaração de amor” (Declaration of love), with poems of Carlos Drummond de Andrade, both for Cia das Letras.

In 2011 illustrated the children book "O imperdível menino que perdia tudo"  by the author Marcelo Pires.

In 2013 his work was selected in the American Illustration Annual 32 and by the  Society of illustrators 56th annual, being exhibited at the Society's building in New York in the year of 2014.

Comics 
Since 2006 Nik Neves works in his project and magazine Inútil (meaning “useless”, in Portuguese), where develops and bring together his comics and more personal works. His work was also published in independent magazines such as C’est Bon Culture (Sweden), Strapazin (Switzerland), +Soma (Brazil), Larva (Colombia). In 2013, along with Rafael Sica and Museu do Trabalho, conceived and organized the first editions of the Independent Publication fair Parada Gráfica, that happens once a year in Porto Alegre, Brazil.

References

External links 
 Suitcase Mag - article about maps
 www.nikilustrador.com
 article at dispatches from Latin America
 spotlight winners of the Latin American AI-AP

Brazilian illustrators
1976 births
Living people